Analog horror is a subgenre of horror fiction and offshoot of the found footage film technique, often cited as originating online during the late 2000s and early 2010s.

Characteristics 
Analog horror is commonly characterized by low-fidelity graphics, cryptic messages, and visual styles reminiscent of late 20th-century television and analog recordings. This is done to match the setting, as analog horror works are typically set between the 1960s and 1990s. It is named "analog horror" because of its aesthetic incorporation of elements related to analog electronics, such as analog television and VHS, the latter being an analog method of recording video.

Analog horror may also be influenced by found footage horror films, such as The Blair Witch Project and the original Japanese version of The Ring. David Lynch's Inland Empire heavily influenced both No Through Road and Petscop, the former of which is a short film from which analog horror originates, and the latter of which is a web series and an alternate reality game rooted in analog horror.

History
Analog horror could be regarded as a form or descendant of creepypasta legends. Many creepypastas anticipated analog horror's themes and presentation: Ben Drowned and NES Godzilla Creepypasta, among others, featured manipulated or contrived footage of "haunted" media, and Candle Cove, a creepypasta from 2009, focused on a mysterious television broadcast. The subgenre is typically cited as originating from late 2000s/2010s Internet (mostly YouTube) videos, specifically from Steven Chamberlain's No Through Road in January 2009, and gaining substantial popularity with the release of Kris Straub's Local 58 in October 2015, from which series' slogan ("ANALOG HORROR AT 476 MHz") the genre received its name. The series, which quickly became successful, would later inspire works such as The Mandela Catalogue and The Walten Files. Another YouTube channel, Kraina Grzybów TV, anticipated many main themes of the genre, publishing videos stylised as a TV program from the 1990s that contained disturbing and surreal imagery, since December 2013.

In 2020, Netflix announced that it would adapt the analog horror podcast Archive 81 into a series of the same name. Despite its positive reception, the show was canceled after a single season.

Examples

No Through Road

No Through Road is a short film-turned-YouTube series created by seventeen-year-old Steven Chamberlain of Stevenage, Hertfordshire in 2009. It is set within the real-world private "no through road" at the entrance of Broomhall Farm, as four teenagers driving home at night find themselves trapped in a loop, eternally passing the same two road signs marking an intersection between Benington and Watton between miles of empty countryside, while also threatened by a mysterious figure (wearing a trench coat, cowboy hat, and drama mask), who can seemingly manipulate the time loop back to an archway at the road's entrance. Other plot aspects include all footage of the events being stolen from MI6 by an unknown individual and uploaded to YouTube.

Composed of four shorts, No Through Road has attained a cult following. First released in January 2009 as a short film, with a sequel web series subsequently releasing from June 2011 to August 2012, No Through Road is considered a foundational work of the analog horror genre.

Local 58

Kris Straub's Local 58 is a series of YouTube videos presented as authentic videotaped footage of a television station that is continuously hijacked over the course of several of decades. While there is no main plot in this series, episodes include messages related to looking at the Moon or the night sky, as well as the in-universe Thought Research Initiative (TRI). Local 58'''s first video was published in 2017 on Halloween.Local 58 is frequently credited with creating and/or popularizing analog horror. Additionally, the series is responsible for naming the genre through its slogan, "ANALOG HORROR AT 476 MHz".

Gemini Home EntertainmentGemini Home Entertainment is a horror anthology series by Remy Abode that initially released in 2019. It centers around the eponymous Gemini Home Entertainment, a fictional distributor of VHS tapes that detail numerous anomalous incidents taking place around the world, including the appearances of various dangerous alien creatures in the United States and an ongoing assault on the Solar System by "The Iris", a sentient rogue planet which sent the entities to Earth as part of its efforts to subjugate the planet and humanity. The creature of the "woodcrawler" in the series is heavily inspired by the Native American mythologies of skinwalkers and the wendigo.

The Mandela CatalogueThe Mandela Catalogue is a YouTube series created by eighteen-year-old Alex Kister of Hubertus, Wisconsin in 2021. It is set in the fictional Mandela County, Wisconsin in the 1990s, which is threatened by the presence of "alternates", doppelgängers who coerce their victims to kill themselves and can manipulate audiovisual mediums. Other plot aspects include Lucifer disguising himself as the biblical archangel Gabriel. Composed of twelve shorts, The Mandela Catalogue became popular online through analysis and reaction videos.

 The Walten Files The Walten Files is an animated analog horror series partially inspired by the Five Nights at Freddy's franchise, created by Martin Walls that became popular in 2020. It is presented as found footage from behind the fictional restaurant Bon's Burgers, which featured animatronic entertainment, and produced by the fictitious Bunny Smiles Company. The story focuses on the backstory of the restaurant and its founders.

 The Smile Tapes The Smile Tapes (stylized as The SMILE Tapes) is an analog horror series created by Patorikku in 2021. The story is set in the mid-1990s in the United States and revolves around a fictitious new drug in circulation on the black market called "SMILE". Usage of the drug induced violent behavior in its users and caused them to laugh and smile uncontrollably. The series was inspired by the fungus Ophiocordyceps unilateralis, a fungus species known for infecting and altering the behavior of ants.

 Chimpy Chippa's   Chimpy Chippa's'' is another analog horror series inspired by Five Nights at Freddy's, Created by Springtock Entertainment, It tells the story of an Australian kid's restaurant that was closed due because of a woman by the name of Miranda Rigby taking 29 people hostile in the restaurant and shooting herself and the Chimpy Chippa Animatronic Scaring Children, In the tapes, the animatronic knows that the viewer is watching and keeps hacking through the tapes, a video game based on the series was released on Itch.io in April 2022

References

Horror genres
Narrative techniques
Horror fiction